Gmina Gołuchów is a rural gmina (administrative district) in Pleszew County, Greater Poland Voivodeship, in west-central Poland.

Villages
Gmina Gołuchów contains the villages and settlements of Bielawy, Bogusławice, Borczysko, Cieśle, Czechel, Czerminek, Gołuchów, Jedlec, Kajew, Karsy, Kościelna Wieś, Krzywosądów, Kucharki, Kuchary, Macew, Pleszówka, Popówek, Szkudła, Tursko, Wszołów and Żychlin.

Neighbouring gminas
Gmina Gołuchów is bordered by the city of Kalisz and by the gminas of Blizanów, Nowe Skalmierzyce, Ostrów Wielkopolski and Pleszew.

References
Polish official population figures 2006

Goluchow
Pleszew County